Wajin may refer to:
Wajin (和人): Yamato people
Wajin (倭人): Wajin (ancient people)